Kerry Arthur Hickey (born 6 April 1960), a former Australian politician, was a member of the New South Wales Legislative Assembly representing the electorate of Cessnock between 1999 and 2011 for the Labor Party.

Early years and background
Prior to entering politics, Hickey was a metal fabricator prior to 1982 and subsequently he was a milk vendor.  In 1981 he was elected as a Councillor of the City of Cessnock.

Political career
He was Minister for Mineral Resources from April 2003 to August 2005, and was Minister for Local Government between 2005 and 2007.

On 7 November 2006, he admitted to having been fined four times in recent years for speeding:  
$127 in 2003
$118 in 2002

The Premier, Morris Iemma resisted calls to sack him as result.  He was quoted as saying:
I'm disappointed that it happened. Like any other motorist, no one is above the law, whether you are a minister, a member of Parliament or a member of the general public. He has apologised, I've accepted that.  Is it a sackable offence? No, but I am very disappointed that it has happened. He's suffering public humiliation as a result.

In an interview with the Newcastle Herald, published on 10 July 2010, Hickey claimed that he was not the father of a child born in February 2009 to an unnamed parliamentary staff member. A month later, on further questioning by the media, Hickey admitted that he had lied about his relationship with the parliamentary staff member and admitted that the 18-month-old child was his. In a dramatic day of lying about his relationship, Hickey initially decided to resign, but after speaking with the Premier Kristina Keneally, he issued a statement stating that he would be seeking re-election. Hickey's initial claims were made in order to protect the mother's career and his family.

Under mounting political and personal pressure, on 6 September 2010 Hickey announced his decision to not seek re-election at the 2011 state election, citing personal reasons.

References

External links
 Speeches in Hansard by Kerry Hickey
 

1960 births
Living people
Members of the New South Wales Legislative Assembly
Australian Labor Party members of the Parliament of New South Wales
21st-century Australian politicians